Witnica may refer to the following places:
Witnica, Greater Poland Voivodeship (west-central Poland)
Witnica in Lubusz Voivodeship (west Poland)
Witnica, West Pomeranian Voivodeship (north-west Poland)